Ana Maria Richa Medeiros (born December 3, 1966) is a retired female beach volleyball player from Brazil, who won the bronze medal in the women's beach team competition at the 2003 Pan American Games in Santo Domingo, Dominican Republic, partnering Larissa França.

In the 1980s she twice was a member of the Brazilian National Women's Indoor Team, that competed at the 1984 (Los Angeles, California) and 1988 Summer Olympics (Seoul, South Korea).

References

External links
 
 

1966 births
Living people
Brazilian women's volleyball players
Brazilian women's beach volleyball players
Volleyball players at the 1984 Summer Olympics
Volleyball players at the 1988 Summer Olympics
Olympic volleyball players of Brazil
Beach volleyball players at the 2003 Pan American Games
Volleyball players from Rio de Janeiro (city)
Pan American Games bronze medalists for Brazil
Pan American Games medalists in volleyball
Medalists at the 2003 Pan American Games